H1821+643 is an extraordinarily luminous, radio-quiet quasar in the constellation of Draco.

The associated Active Galactic Nucleus (AGN) is situated in the Brightest Central Galaxy (BCG) of a massive, strong cooling flow cluster, CL 1821+64. Russel et al (2010) spatially isolated its X-ray signal from the surrounding cluster in Chandra X-ray observatory observations and computed  from the observed X-ray luminosity.

Supermassive Black Hole
The SMBH centred in CL 1821+64 is believed to be among the most massive in the known Universe. A variety of techniques have found different values for the mass. 5 studies found values . Kim et al (2004) and Floyd et al (2008) used galactic bulge luminosity fits derived from Hubble data to find  and  respectively. Kolman et al (1991) and Shapovalova (2016) independently modelled the quasar UV spectrum to find . Capellupo et al (2017) found  using  line emissions. 2 independent X-ray studies found significantly higher values. Reynolds et al (2014) found  by modelling reflection from the accretion disc and Walker et al found  by modelling the interaction of the black hole with the Intracluster medim (ICM) as a Compton-cooled feeding cycle.  is in the range .

If the hole were a Euclidean sphere, the average density would be 18 g/m3,  the density of air at sea level on Earth.

Footnotes

References

External links
 Simbad, SIMBAD
 NED,  NED, NASA/IPAC Extragalactic Database

Draco (constellation)
Quasars
Supermassive black holes